Beira Airport is an airport in Beira, Mozambique . It has 3 asphalt runways.

Airlines and destinations

References

Statistics

External links

Airports in Mozambique
Buildings and structures in Beira, Mozambique
Buildings and structures in Sofala Province